Steve Forde is the first solo album by Australian Country music star Steve Forde which is both a greatest hits CD and has brand new content. The CD produced two singles both of which reached the number one position on the CMC request charts.

Track listing

Standard edition

Summer's Little Angel
Metropolis
Beer And Women
Dust
Drinking Things Over
The Letter
Another Man
Rodeo Freak
Captain Good Times
Crazy Love
That's What I'm Talking About
Life's Getting In The Way Of Living

Limited edition CD/DVD

Disc one
Summer's Little Angel
Metropolis
Beer And Women
Dust
Drinking Things Over
The Letter
Another Man
Rodeo Freak
Captain Good Times
Crazy Love
That's What I'm Talking About
Life's Getting In The Way Of Living

Disc two
The second disc is a DVD which contains film clips of the following songs:
Aussie Philosophy
Rodeo Freak
The Letter
Another Man
That Too (Live At The Deni Ute Muster)
You Shook Me All Night Long (Live At The Deni Ute Muster)

Singles
Metropolis
Summer's Little Angel

Charts

References

2007 albums
Steve Forde albums
Albums produced by Richard Landis